John Shulman (born June 28, 1966) is the men’s head basketball coach at the University of Alabama Huntsville. He is a former head varsity boys' basketball coach at The McCallie School. Shulman also was head men's basketball coach at the University of Tennessee at Chattanooga. He joined TN-based Access America Transport in 2013 as Director of Sales for the organization. McCallie announced the hiring of Shulman in March 2014, saying he would serve not only as Head Basketball Coach, but also as the Director of Community Outreach.

Head coaching record

References

1966 births
Living people
American men's basketball coaches
Basketball coaches from Tennessee
Chattanooga Mocs men's basketball coaches
East Tennessee State Buccaneers men's basketball coaches
East Tennessee State University alumni
High school basketball coaches in the United States
People from Johnson City, Tennessee
Tennessee Tech Golden Eagles men's basketball coaches
Wofford Terriers men's basketball coaches